Katrina Porter, OAM (born 29 November 1988) is an Australian Paralympic swimmer. She was born in Perth with arthrogryposis multiplex congenita, a condition that causes muscle weakness and joint stiffness. She used hydrotherapy as a child and moved to competitive swimming at the age of ten.

She competed in three events but did not win any medals in the 2004 Athens Games. At the 2006 IPC Swimming World Championships in Durban, South Africa, she won a bronze medal in the Women's 100m Breaststroke SB6.  At the 2008 Beijing Games, she competed in five events and won a gold medal in the Women's 100 m Backstroke S7 event in a world record, for which she received a Medal of the Order of Australia.

She has been an Australian Institute of Sport paralympic swimming scholarship holder. She is a Western Australian Institute of Sport scholarship holder.

In 2010, she was a finalist for the Western Australia Young Australian of the Year award.  In 2011, she was named the Western Australian Multi Class Swimmer of the Year. Her ex-partner Michael Hartnett has represented Australia in wheelchair basketball.

She competed at the 2012 Summer Paralympics.

References

External links
 

Female Paralympic swimmers of Australia
Swimmers at the 2004 Summer Paralympics
Swimmers at the 2008 Summer Paralympics
Paralympic gold medalists for Australia
Les Autres category Paralympic competitors
Recipients of the Medal of the Order of Australia
1988 births
Living people
Australian Institute of Sport Paralympic swimmers
Swimmers at the 2012 Summer Paralympics
Western Australian Institute of Sport alumni
Sportswomen from Western Australia
Swimmers from Perth, Western Australia
People educated at John XXIII College, Perth
Medalists at the 2008 Summer Paralympics
S7-classified Paralympic swimmers
Medalists at the World Para Swimming Championships
Paralympic medalists in swimming
Australian female freestyle swimmers
Australian female breaststroke swimmers
Australian female backstroke swimmers
20th-century Australian women
21st-century Australian women